Mendax marginatus is a species of minute sea snail, a marine gastropod mollusc in the family Cerithiopsidae.

Distribution
This marine species is endemic to New Zealand

References

 Spencer, H.G., Marshall, B.A. & Willan, R.C. (2009). Checklist of New Zealand living Mollusca. Pp 196-219. in: Gordon, D.P. (ed.) New Zealand inventory of biodiversity. Volume one. Kingdom Animalia: Radiata, Lophotrochozoa, Deuterostomia. Canterbury University Press, Christchurch

Further reading
 Powell A. W. B., New Zealand Mollusca, William Collins Publishers Ltd, Auckland, New Zealand 1979 
 Suter H. (1908). Additions to the marine molluscan fauna of New Zealand, with descriptions of new species. Proceedings of the Malacological Society of London. 8: 22-42, pls 2-3

Cerithiopsidae
Gastropods of New Zealand
Gastropods described in 1908